Everson Felipe Marques Pires (born 22 July 1990), simply known as Everson, is a Brazilian professional footballer who plays as a goalkeeper for Atlético Mineiro.

Club career

Early career
Born in Pindamonhangaba, São Paulo, Everson joined São Paulo FC's youth setup in 2003, aged 13, from hometown side Associação Atlética Ferroviária. In 2010, he was loaned to Série B side Guaratinguetá until the expiration of his contract.

Everson subsequently joined Guará permanently, but spent the vast majority of his spell as a backup to Jailson and Saulo. He made his professional debut on 2 June 2010, starting in a 3–0 away loss against Ipatinga.

On 2 January 2014, Everson signed for River and became an immediate first-choice. On 12 June, he moved to Série D team Confiança, helping in the club's promotion to Série C in his first season. While at the latter club, he also scored the game's only through a penalty kick in an away success over Estanciano for the Campeonato Sergipano championship.

Ceará
On 5 August 2015, Everson signed a three-year contract with Ceará in the second division. He became a regular starter from the following campaign, being an important unit as his side achieved promotion to the Série A.

Everson made his top tier debut on 15 April 2018, starting in a 2–0 away loss against Santos. On 6 September, he scored the opener through a free kick in a 2–1 home defeat of Corinthians.

On 31 December 2018, Everson extended his contract with Vozão until 2021.

Santos
On 24 January 2019, Everson signed a four-year contract with Santos, for a rumoured fee of R$ 4 million. He made his debut for the club on 9 February, keeping a clean sheet in a 1–0 Campeonato Paulista home defeat of Mirassol.

Everson made his top tier debut for Peixe on 2 June 2019, starting in a 1–0 away defeat of former club Ceará. He ended the season as a starter, appearing in 32 league matches and overtaking longtime incumbent Vanderlei (who subsequently left for Grêmio). On 19 July 2020, he filed a legal action against the club, alleging unpaid wages, but lost at first instance two days later.

In August 2020, after having his contract maintained by the Court, Everson asked to return to the club and stated that he "regretted the action". After being reinstated by manager Cuca, however, he was demoted to fourth-choice behind João Paulo, Vladimir and John.

Atlético Mineiro
On 10 September 2020, Everson joined Atlético Mineiro on a two-year contract and a deal worth R$ 6 million. He was immediately inserted as first-choice goalkeeper, taking over the role from Rafael. Galo finished in third in the Brasileirão, with Everson keeping nine clean sheets. Before the next season started, the club won both the Campeonato Mineiro and their group in the Copa Libertadores with Everson in goal. The knockout stage tie with Argentinian giants Boca Juniors went to a penalty shootout after the second leg, and after saving two penalties, Everson took the decisive penalty as Atlético Mineiro advanced to the quarter-finals.

International career
On 27 August 2021, Everson received his first call up to the Brazil national team ahead of 2022 FIFA World Cup qualifiers.

Career statistics

List of goals scored
Following, is the list with the goals scored by Everson:

Honours
River
Campeonato Piauiense: 2014

Confiança
Campeonato Sergipano: 2015

Ceará
Taça Asa Branca: 2016
Campeonato Cearense: 2017, 2018

Atlético Mineiro
Campeonato Brasileiro Série A: 2021
Copa do Brasil: 2021
Campeonato Mineiro: 2021, 2022
Supercopa do Brasil: 2022

Individual
Bola de Prata: 2021

References

External links

1990 births
Living people
Brazilian footballers
People from Pindamonhangaba
Footballers from São Paulo (state)
Association football goalkeepers
Campeonato Brasileiro Série A players
Campeonato Brasileiro Série B players
Campeonato Brasileiro Série C players
Campeonato Brasileiro Série D players
São Paulo FC players
Guaratinguetá Futebol players
River Atlético Clube players
Associação Desportiva Confiança players
Ceará Sporting Club players
Santos FC players
Clube Atlético Mineiro players